On the event of her wedding to Alexander Duff, 1st Duke of Fife at the Private Chapel of Buckingham Palace in London on 27 July, 1889, Princess Louise of Wales wore a wedding dress of white satin, trimmed with lace and orange flowers with a bridal veil. The dress was distinguished by a high v-shaped Medici collar. Louise carried a bouquet of orange flowers. The author of the report of the wedding in the Court Circular column  of The Times wrote that "In truth, there is here little room for description other than technical, since every bride has the appearance of a vision of pure white". Louise's bridesmaids wore simple pink dresses with knots of roses in their hair.

See also
 List of individual dresses

References

1880s fashion
Louise
House of Saxe-Coburg and Gotha (United Kingdom)
British royal attire
1889 in London